Abdoul Karim Meckassoua (born in the Bangui neighborhood of PK5 on 31 December 1953) is a Central African politician, and was the President of the Central African National Assembly between 06.05.2016 and 29.10.2018.

On 15 August 2021 he fled the country after Constitutional Court impeached him following accusations of participation in 2021 coup attempt.

References

Living people
Central African Republic politicians
Foreign ministers of the Central African Republic
Presidents of the National Assembly (Central African Republic)
1953 births